William Christopher Armfield (7 July 1904 – 1985) was an English professional footballer of the 1930s. Born in Birmingham, he joined Gillingham from Exeter City in 1932 and went on to make 30 appearances for the club in The Football League, scoring seven goals. He left to join non-league Droitwich in 1933.

References

External links
Rootsweb
AVFC History
The Grecian Archive

1904 births
1985 deaths
English footballers
Gillingham F.C. players
Exeter City F.C. players
Footballers from Birmingham, West Midlands
Association footballers not categorized by position